Drazdy (Drozdy) is a microdistrict in north-west Minsk where many top state officials lived during the Soviet times and today, including the President of Belarus, Alexander Lukashenko.

See also
Drazdy conflict

References

Microraions of Minsk